Siegfried Heinrich Aronhold (16 July 1819 – 13 March 1884) was a German mathematician who worked on invariant theory and introduced the symbolic method. He was born in Angerburg, East Prussia, and died, aged 64, in Berlin, Germany.

References

External links
 Author profile in the database zbMATH

Further reading  
 

19th-century German mathematicians
1819 births
1884 deaths
People from Węgorzewo
People from East Prussia
Members of the Göttingen Academy of Sciences and Humanities
Academic staff of the Technical University of Berlin